Christopher Lee Tidland (born September 28, 1972) is an American professional golfer who currently plays on the Web.com Tour.

Tidland was born in Torrance, California. He attended Oklahoma State University, and graduated in 1995 with a management degree. He led his team to the 1995 NCAA Division I Men's Championship and finished second in the individual tournament.

Tidland turned professional after graduating. He played on the Nationwide Tour in 1996, 1999, 2002–06, and 2008-09 where he won two events - the 2008 Albertsons Boise Open and the 2009 Preferred Health Systems Wichita Open. 

Tidland played on the PGA Tour in 2001 and 2007 with his best finish a T-6 at the 2007 AT&T Classic. He was unable to finish high enough on the money list to retain his Tour card either year. In 2009, he finished 6th on the Nationwide Tour money list to earn his 2010 PGA Tour card. Tidland finished 148th on the Tour, retaining conditional status for 2011.

Tidland also played on the Canadian Tour in 1997 and 1998, where he won the Bayer Championship in 1998.

In 2011, Tidland qualified for the British Open. In 2011, he made his 13th appearance at Q School, three less than the record of 16 set by Jeff Hart. He failed to earn his card and will return to the Nationwide Tour in 2012.

Professional wins (3)

Nationwide Tour wins (2)

Nationwide Tour playoff record (0–3)

Canadian Tour wins (1)
1998 Bayer Championship

Results in major championships

Note: Haas never played in the Masters Tournament nor the PGA Championship.

 CUT = missed the half-way cut

See also
2000 PGA Tour Qualifying School graduates
2006 PGA Tour Qualifying School graduates
2009 Nationwide Tour graduates

References

External links

American male golfers
Oklahoma State Cowboys golfers
PGA Tour golfers
Korn Ferry Tour graduates
Golfers from California
Golfers from Oklahoma
Sportspeople from Torrance, California
1972 births
Living people